Chase Oliver (born 1985) is an American political activist, sales account executive, and HR representative. Oliver was the Libertarian Party nominee for the 2022 United States Senate election in Georgia, and the Libertarian Party nominee for the 2020 Georgia's 5th congressional district special election.

Early life 
Oliver was born in 1985 in Nashville, Tennessee.

Political career 
Oliver was previously a Democrat and had supported Barack Obama in the 2008 U.S. presidential election but later left the Democratic Party due to his own anti-war views, which he felt were not being adequately represented by the party. Oliver joined the Libertarian Party in 2010 after meeting several members of the party at an Atlanta Pride Festival.

2020 U.S. House campaign
Oliver first ran for public office in 2020, where he was the Libertarian nominee for the 2020 Georgia's 5th congressional district special election to replace John Lewis, who had died from pancreatic cancer earlier that year. He won 2% of the vote and was eliminated during the blanket primary.

2022 U.S. Senate campaign
Oliver became the Libertarian nominee for the 2022 U.S. Senate election in Georgia, where he faced off against the incumbent Democratic Raphael Warnock and Republican Party challenger Herschel Walker. On October 16, 2022, Oliver attended a debate hosted by Georgia Public Broadcasting and debated against Warnock, as well as an empty podium representing Walker, who had declined to attend the debate.

On election day, Oliver received over 2% of the popular vote, forcing the Georgia senate race into a run-off. He declined to endorse either Warnock or Walker, but offered to host a Internet forum between the two candidates.

2024 presidential campaign 
On December 2, 2022, Oliver announced that he was forming an exploratory committee to look into a run for the Libertarian presidential nomination in the 2024 U.S. presidential election.

Political positions

Abortion
Oliver considers himself as pro-choice, although he is opposed to funding abortion through public money. He believes that abortion should be allowed nationwide, and he has said he would vote for legislation to make it so.

Climate change 
Oliver supports a free market solution to climate change, believing that if businesses are left alone, that they will develop further technologies that will eventually replace current carbon-based fuels.

Electoral reform 
Oliver is a strong supporter of ranked-choice voting in the United States, which he has said would have prevented the 2022 U.S. Senate election in Georgia from going to a run-off by allowing candidates to rank their preferred candidates when they voted the first time. He has also stated that ranked-choice voting would save millions of taxpayer dollars by allowing run-offs to be instant, while ensuring that winning candidates always get above 50% of the vote.

Gun rights 
During a 2022 debate with Warnock, Oliver expressed his support for gun rights, stating: "Armed gays are harder to oppress, and they're harder to bash."

War on drugs
Oliver advocates ending the war on drugs, and supports the legalization of marijuana.

Personal life
Oliver is openly gay and resides in suburban Atlanta.

Electoral history

References

External links 
 

 

1984 births
Living people
American LGBT politicians
Candidates in the 2022 United States Senate elections
Gay politicians
Georgia (U.S. state) Democrats
Georgia (U.S. state) Libertarians
Georgia (U.S. state) politicians
Politicians from Atlanta
Politicians from Nashville, Tennessee